Monroe Township, Ohio may refer to:

Monroe Township, Adams County, Ohio
Monroe Township, Allen County, Ohio
Monroe Township, Ashtabula County, Ohio
Monroe Township, Carroll County, Ohio
Monroe Township, Clermont County, Ohio
Monroe Township, Coshocton County, Ohio
Monroe Township, Darke County, Ohio
Monroe Township, Guernsey County, Ohio
Monroe Township, Harrison County, Ohio
Monroe Township, Henry County, Ohio
Monroe Township, Holmes County, Ohio
Monroe Township, Knox County, Ohio
Monroe Township, Licking County, Ohio
Monroe Township, Logan County, Ohio
Monroe Township, Madison County, Ohio
Monroe Township, Miami County, Ohio
Monroe Township, Muskingum County, Ohio
Monroe Township, Perry County, Ohio
Monroe Township, Pickaway County, Ohio
Monroe Township, Preble County, Ohio
Monroe Township, Putnam County, Ohio
Monroe Township, Richland County, Ohio

See also
Monroe Township (disambiguation)

Ohio township disambiguation pages